Round Lake (Weagamow Lake) Airport  is located  east of Round Lake, Ontario, Canada.

Airlines and destinations

See also
 Round Lake (Weagamow Lake) Water Aerodrome

References

External links

Certified airports in Kenora District